Classic Songs, My Way is a 2007 album by Paul Anka. It follows the same formula of his previous album, 2005's Rock Swings.

Track listing
Original writers/performers appear in parenthesis

Disc 1 - My Way
 "Time After Time" (Cyndi Lauper)
 "Get Here" (Oleta Adams)
 "Mr. Brightside" (The Killers)
 "Waiting for a Girl Like You" (Foreigner)
 "Ordinary World" (Duran Duran)
 "Heaven" (Bryan Adams)
 "Bad Day" (Daniel Powter)
 "I Go to Extremes" (Billy Joel)
 "Both Sides, Now" (Joni Mitchell)
 "You Are My Destiny" (with Michael Bublé)
 "Walking in Memphis" (Marc Cohn)
 "Against the Wind" (Bob Seger)
 "My Way" (with Jon Bon Jovi)
Disc 2 - Classic Songs
 "Diana"
 "Don't Gamble with Love"
 "I Love You Baby"
 "You Are My Destiny"
 "Crazy Love"
 "My Heart Sings"
 "Lonely Boy"
 "Put Your Head On My Shoulder"
 "My Home Town"
 "Puppy Love"
 "Adam & Eve"
 "Tonight My Love, Tonight"
 "Cinderella"
 "Dance On Little Girl"
 "A Steel Guitar & A Glass Of Wine"
 "It Doesn't Matter Anymore"
 "Ogni Volta"
 "Les Filles De Paris"
 "I'm Not Anyone" (with Sammy Davis Jr)
 "You Are My Destiny" (Instrumental Reprise)

References

Paul Anka albums
Covers albums
2007 albums
Albums produced by Don Costa
Decca Records albums